Sören Dieckmann (born 16 January 1996) is a German professional footballer who plays as a left-back for Hoffenheim II.

Career
In January 2019, Dieckmann moved from Borussia Dortmund II to 2. Bundesliga club SV Sandhausen. He made his professional debut for Sandhausen in the 2. Bundesliga on 30 January 2019, starting in the away match against Hamburger SV before being substituted out in the 58th minute for Fabian Schleusener, with the match finishing as a 2–1 loss.

References

External links
 
 
 

1996 births
Living people
Footballers from Dortmund
German footballers
Association football fullbacks
Borussia Dortmund II players
SV Sandhausen players
SC Fortuna Köln players
TSG 1899 Hoffenheim II players
2. Bundesliga players
Regionalliga players
Oberliga (football) players